Ronald Burns (10 April 1933 – 29 May 1999) was a British swimmer. He competed in the men's 400 metre freestyle and men's 4 × 200 metre freestyle relay events at the 1952 Summer Olympics.

References

External links
 

1933 births
1999 deaths
British male swimmers
British male freestyle swimmers
Olympic swimmers of Great Britain
Swimmers at the 1952 Summer Olympics
Place of birth missing
20th-century British people